Joe Farrell Quartet is a jazz album by Joe Farrell that was released by CTI Records. It was recorded at the Van Gelder Studio on July 1 and 2, 1970. Guitarist John McLaughlin plays on two tracks, and there are two duo tracks, one with Dave Holland and one with Chick Corea. The album was re-released twice in the mid 1970s (with different cover art in each instance) as Super Session and  Song of the Wind.

Track listing

Side one
"Follow Your Heart" (McLaughlin) – 6:50
"Collage for Polly" (Farrell) – 2:28
"Circle in the Square" (Farrell) – 7:11

Side two
"Molten Glass" (Farrell) – 5:15
"Alter Ego" (Farrell) – 1:23 (duet with Dave Holland)
"Song of the Wind" (Corea) – 5:57 (duet with Chick Corea)
"Motion" (Corea) – 5:13

Personnel
Joe Farrell – tenor saxophone, flute, oboe
Chick Corea – piano
Dave Holland – double bass
Jack DeJohnette – drums
John McLaughlin – guitar ("Follow Your Heart" and "Motion" only)

Recording credits
Engineer – Rudy Van Gelder
Cover photograph – Pete Turner
Liner photographs – Robert Brosan
Album design – Sam Antupit

References

1970 debut albums
Albums produced by Creed Taylor
Albums recorded at Van Gelder Studio
Chick Corea albums
CTI Records albums
Dave Holland albums
Jack DeJohnette albums
Joe Farrell albums
John McLaughlin (musician) albums